Lactobionic acid (4-O-β-galactopyranosyl-D-gluconic acid) is a sugar acid.  It is a disaccharide formed from gluconic acid and galactose.  It can be formed by oxidation of lactose.  The carboxylate anion of lactobionic acid is known as lactobionate.

As an acid, lactobionic acid can form salts with mineral cations such as calcium, potassium, sodium and zinc.  Calcium lactobionate is a food additive used as a stabilizer. Potassium lactobionate is added to organ preservation solutions such as Viaspan or CoStorSol to provide osmotic support and prevent cell swelling. Mineral salts of lactobionic acid are also used for mineral supplementation.

Lactobionic acid is also used in the cosmetics industry as an antioxidant and in the pharmaceutical industry as an excipient for formulation. For example, the antibiotic erythromycin is used as the salt erythromycin lactobionate when intravenously delivered.

References

Disaccharides
Sugar acids
Vicinal diols
Alpha hydroxy acids